

Birds

Suborder Passeri
A songbird is a bird belonging to the suborder Passeri of Passeriformes, also known as Oscines.

Musical Birds
A songbird may also refer to any bird that utters a succession of musical tones which resembles a song.

 Asian koel, a member of the cuckoo order of birds, the Cuculiformes, traditionally held in high regard for its song.

Songbird or Song Bird may also refer to:

Film and television
 Songbird (2018 film), a British comedy-drama film
 Songbird (2020 film), an American science-fiction thriller film
 Song Bird (TV series), a 1989–1990 Hong Kong historical drama series
 Songbird (TV program), a 2008 Philippine variety show
 Songbird, an airplane in the 1950s American TV series Sky King

Music
 Songbirds (group), an Australian country music group

Record labels
 Song Bird Records, an American record label
 SongBird, a Dutch record label

Albums
 Song Bird (Deniece Williams album), 1977
 Song Bird (Margo Smith album), 1976
 Songbird (Barbra Streisand album) or the title song (see below), 1978
 Songbird (Eva Cassidy album), 1998
 Songbird (Kokia album), 1999
 Songbird (Tayla Alexander album) or the title song, 2012
 Songbird (Willie Nelson album), 2006
 Songbird: Rare Tracks and Forgotten Gems, a box set by Emmylou Harris, 2007
 Songbird (Marina Prior box set), 2014

Songs
 "Songbird" (Barbra Streisand song), 1978
 "Songbird" (Bernard Fanning song), 2005
 "Songbird" (Ellen Benediktson song), from Melodifestivalen 2014
 "Songbird" (Fleetwood Mac song), 1977; covered by Eva Cassidy (1998) and Willie Nelson (2006)
 "Songbird" (Kenny G composition), 1987
 "Songbird" (Oasis song), 2003
 "Songbird", by Abigail from Home...Again, 2005
 "Songbird", by Jeff Lynne's ELO from From Out of Nowhere, 2019
 "Songbirds", by Silversun Pickups from Widow's Weeds, 2019

Other uses
 Songbird (comics), a Marvel Comics superhero
 Songbird (horse) (foaled 2013), an American Thoroughbred racehorse
 Songbird (software), a 2006–2013 audio player
 Songbird Airways, a charter airline based in Miami, Florida, US
 Songbird, a character in the video game BioShock Infinite
 Songbird Acquisitions, a former majority owner of Canary Wharf Group